Allison Kaden (born November 1, 1977) is a general assignment reporter for WPIX-TV in New York City. Kaden joined the station in 2004, after working for News 12 The Bronx. She was hit by a car on March 4, 2010, but returned six weeks later.

Education and training
Kaden holds a bachelor's degree in American Studies from Tulane University and in 2000, earned a master's degree in journalism from Northwestern University's Medill School of Journalism. She also studied photography at American University of Paris.

Awards and nominations
Kaden was nominated for a 2005 Emmy Award by the National Academy of Television Arts & Sciences-New York City in the category Educational Programming: Segment(s) for a piece she did for News 12 The Bronx entitled "In Depth-Waterfront"  which aired on July 5, 2004.

Kaden received a Special Mention in 2005 from the New York State Associated Press Broadcasters Association in the category Best Spot News Coverage for a piece on WPIX entitled "Chopper Down."

In 2007, Kaden won a New York Emmy in the category Spot News Story for her part in a report entitled "East Side Explosion."

References

External links
 Results of 2005 New York state AP television news awards contest
 2005 New York Emmy Award Nominations (see Page 7)
 2007 New York Emmy Award Winners (see page 1)
  CH. 5 NEWS TRIES A BIG POWER PLAY (see last item)

American reporters and correspondents
American television journalists
American women television journalists
New York (state) television reporters
Living people
Medill School of Journalism alumni
Tulane University alumni
American University of Paris alumni
1977 births
21st-century American women